Modern Masquerades is the fourth and final studio album by Northern Irish progressive rock band Fruupp, released on 14 November 1975 in the United Kingdom on the Pye label's underground and progressive music imprint Dawn Records. Recorded from August to September 1975 at Basing Street Studios in London, it was produced by multi-instrumental musician Ian McDonald, best known as a founding member of King Crimson and Foreigner. In addition to the production role, McDonald also played alto saxophone and percussion.

Modern Masquerades proved to be the only Fruupp's recording without founding keyboardist Stephen Houston who had been replaced by John Mason in early 1975. The supporting tour commenced in Hastings on 5 December 1975 and finished in Manchester on 2 February 1976.

American hip-hop artist Talib Kweli used "Sheba's Song" as the basis for his track "Soon the New Day" from the album Eardrum (2007) which reached number 2 on the US Billboard 200 chart.

Track listing

Personnel

Fruupp
Peter Farrelly – lead vocals, bass guitar
John Mason – keyboards, vibes, vocals, French horn arrangements
Vincent McCusker – lead guitars, vocals
Martin Foye – drums, percussion, vocals

Additional musicians
Ian McDonald – alto saxophone, percussion, French horn arrangements; producer
Greg Bowen – trumpet
Terry Johnes – French horns
Barry Castle – French horns
Frank Ryecroft – French horns
Peter Civil – French horns

Technical personnel
Chris Kimsey – engineer
Dave Hutchins – assistant engineer
Martin Cropper – art direction
Richard Strong – art direction
Martin Goddard – photography
Robert Howe – illustration

References

Fruupp albums
1975 albums
Albums produced by Ian McDonald (musician)